The 2020 FIBA Women's Olympic Qualifying Tournament in Bourges was one of four 2020 FIBA Women's Olympic Qualifying Tournaments. The tournament was held in Bourges, France, from 6 to 9 February 2020.

France, Australia and Puerto Rico qualified for the Olympics.

Teams

Venue

Squads

Standings

Results
All times are local (UTC+1).

Statistics and awards

Statistical leaders
Players

Points

Rebounds

Assists

Blocks

Steals

Teams

Points

Rebounds

Assists

Blocks

Steals

Awards
The all star-teams and MVP were announced on 9 February 2020.

References

External links
Official website

FIBA World Olympic Qualifying Tournament for Women
     
Qual
2019–20 in French basketball
International women's basketball competitions hosted by France